The Brighton Dome is an arts venue in Brighton, England, that contains the Concert Hall, the Corn Exchange and the Studio Theatre (formerly the Pavilion Theatre). All three venues are linked to the rest of the Royal Pavilion Estate by a tunnel to the Royal Pavilion in Pavilion Gardens and through shared corridors to Brighton Museum.

History of the buildings 

The Concert Hall and Riding School (now the Corn Exchange) were built for the Prince Regent (later George IV) and work started in 1803 to the designs of William Porden.

Concert Hall 
The Concert Hall was the Prince Regent's stables and held 44 horses in a circular stable arrangement with space for the groomsmen on the balcony level above. The stables were based on the Halle au Ble (Corn Market) in Paris which had been built in 1782. In the centre of the room was a large lotus-shaped fountain which was used to water the horses. The stables were built in an Indian Mughal style with a vast glass dome covering the room. When the Awadh state in India fell into the hands of British, they wanted to emulate the Mughal architecture. It was a very ambitious piece of construction at the time and many people thought the glass roof would fall in once the scaffolding was removed. The stables were occupied by 1806 and the exterior finished in 1808.

In 1850 Queen Victoria, who had inherited the estate, sold the Royal Pavilion Estate to the town for £50,000 (some people quote £53,000 but the price was reduced because of the removal of the Chapel Royal from the sale)  and a number of different uses were proposed for the Concert Hall site. These included, but were not limited to, a law court and a swimming baths. The vote to turn the Concert Hall into an assembly rooms was passed by a very small majority. In 1866 plans were approved by the Pavilion Committee and work began to the Moorish designs of Philip Lockwood. The designs were very different from the interior seen today and featured richly coloured paintings, stained glass windows and a large gas powered chandelier formed the centerpiece to the room. The main chandelier was accompanied by eight smaller ones which hung under the balcony around the room. However, with over 520 gas jets the chandelier was very expensive to light and in 1886 the chandelier was using electricity installed by Magnus Volk alongside gas. In 1888 the central chandelier was taken down, thought because of the expensive running costs; however customers reported the room was now too dim and so parts of the chandelier were rehung.

In 1900 the chandelier was rehung in the Concert Hall as it was thought to strengthen the roof but its return was short-lived. In 1934 the Dome was refurbished yet again to the art deco designs of Robert Atkinson. The chandeliers did not complement his design and the lowered ceiling would not have accommodated the vast chandelier and so the chandeliers came down for the last time.

The Concert Hall was to undergo yet another transformation and in 1934 work began to the designs of Robert Atkinson. Atkinson had designed a number of iconic buildings including the Regent Cinema and the Daily Express Building in London. The glazing on the roof was replaced, the Concert Hall interior was completely removed and replaced with an art deco style complete with walnut paneling and new entrances were introduced. It was at this time that the present day Dome Organ was installed.

Concert Hall events once included weekly Methodist services on Sunday evenings, which attracted large crowds in the postwar period. In the 1960s–1970s, these services were led by Rev. Frank Thewlis.

In 2002 the Dome was reopened by Princess Anne after undergoing a transformation to bring the facilities up to modern standards. These included but were not limited to a state-of-the-art acoustic system in the Concert Hall, new and improved seating, stage lifts and improved foyer facilities. This renovation cost £22 million and this rebirth was ushered in with the help of the London Philharmonic Orchestra, Courtney Pine, Nigel Kennedy and Fatboy Slim (amongst others).

It is one of the few buildings to have both internal and external listings, both for its Indian-style exterior and for its 1930s Art Deco interior.

Corn Exchange 
The Corn Exchange was built as the riding school for the Prince Regent (later George IV). The roof is unique; in order to provide as much height as possible no tie beams were provided, instead arched timbers. There was a Royal balcony built for the Prince Regent to watch his horses on the Eastern wall which was later removed. From 1856 to 1864 the stables and the Riding School were let as Cavalry Barracks and on 1 October 1868 the Riding School officially became the town's Corn Exchange. The Corn Exchange underwent a number of transformations and in 1934–35 a new frontage was built featuring a large sculpture of the goddess of corn Ceres by the artist James Woodford. The Canadian maple sprung floor was installed during this period and a new balcony installed at the South End which provided a new entrance into the Supper Rooms. Extensive works began in 2017 to renovate the Corn Exchange and Studio Theatre.

The Studio Theatre 
The Studio Theatre stands on the original site of Mrs Fitzherbert's stables, which were built at the same time as the stables. After the stables the building was converted into Dome Cottage, the ivy-clad Dome Cottage as it once stood in New Road. This picturesque cottage with creeper-covered walls was once part of Regency Brighton and the historic home of Miss Annie Brown, who now lives in Grand Avenue, Hove. Originally the coachman’s cottage adjoining the Prince Regent’s private stables in the Royal Pavilion grounds, it stood on the present site of the Pavilion Theatre in New Road and was known as the Dome Cottage until it was pulled down in 1932. Miss Brown lived there with her parents for more than forty years while her father, Mr F. W. Brown, was works supervisor of the Pavilion Estate. She well remembers, at the age of seven, playing in the courtyard, which is now part of the theatre. This photograph shows Miss Brown’s parents at the cottage door. During the First World War it was always open to patients from the emergency hospital set up in the Dome and the Corn Exchange, and Miss Brown’s memories include many visitors from the Indian fighting contingent whom she helped to entertain.'  After 1932 the building was converted into the Supper Rooms to the designs of Robert Atkinson and completed in 1935. It was later known as the Pavilion Theatre until 2012 when it was renamed The Studio Theatre.

First World War 
During the First World War the Dome, as well as the Pavilion, was used to house injured Indian soldiers. It was thought that they would feel more at home in the Indian surroundings. Between 1 December 1914 and 15 February 1916 over 4,000 wounded Indian soldiers were nursed back to health at the makeshift hospitals set up inside the buildings of the Royal Pavilion estate. Three operating theatres were installed, one inside Brighton Dome itself. The India Gate, completed in 1921 and visible on the south side of the Pavilion Gardens, was a gift from the people of India, erected to commemorate their fallen soldiers.

Music 
The suite that would become The Dark Side of the Moon was premièred at the Dome by Pink Floyd on 20 January 1972.

Brighton Dome staged the Eurovision Song Contest on 6 April 1974, when ABBA won for Sweden with the song "Waterloo". The UK's national selection show Eurovision: You Decide was held in the venue on 7 February 2018, hosted by Mel Giedroyc and Måns Zelmerlöw.

Other events
British YouTuber TommyInnit hosted a show at the Dome on 1 July 2022. The show included appearances by fellow YouTubers such as Jack Manifold, Ranboo, DanTDM and Nihachu. The show included a tribute to fellow Minecraft content creator Technoblade, whose death was announced the day prior.

The Dome Organ
One of the Dome's most famous features is its pipe organ. The first pipe organ in the Dome's Concert Hall was built in 1870 by the famous London firm of Henry Willis & Sons to a specification of forty-four stops spread over four manuals and pedals. This instrument was removed in 1935 for the great rebuilding of the theatre and was never returned, but broken up for parts. The present instrument which replaced it in 1935 was built by the firm of Hill, Norman and Beard. This organ has four manuals and one hundred and seventy-eight stops obtained by extension and borrowing of numerous ranks, plus numerous percussion effects. With 42 rows of pipes in four chambers, the unit construction with electro-pneumatic action produced 250 stop tabs. The organ also has many special effect stops, such as orchestral bells, marimba, harp, bird whistles and sleigh bells.

References

External links

1805 establishments in England
Domes
Grade I listed buildings in Brighton and Hove
Theatres in Brighton and Hove
Tourist attractions in Brighton and Hove